Steven "Steve" Convery  (born 27 October 1972, in Glasgow) is a Scottish former professional footballer.

Career

Convery began his career with junior side Arthurlie, and won the Scottish Junior Cup with them in 1998, scoring a goal in the final. In the summer of 1998, he was part of the Junior revolution which swept through Clyde, being one of eleven players coming from the junior ranks to join the Bully Wee. Convery became a fan favourite during his time with Clyde, and his goals were vital in the team winning the Scottish Second Division championship in 2000.

His final few years at Clyde were disrupted by several injuries, and he left in 2003 to join Hamilton Academical, after making 139 appearances and scoring 26 goals in 5 years. He spent two years at Hamilton before returning to Arthurlie. He signed for Beith Juniors in 2006, and retired from the game in 2008 after a leg break in a match against his former team, Arthurlie. He made 15 starts and scored 3 goals in his time as a player at Beith. He is now a coach at Beith.

External links

1972 births
Footballers from Glasgow
Living people
Scottish footballers
Scottish Football League players
Clyde F.C. players
Hamilton Academical F.C. players
Arthurlie F.C. players
Association football forwards
Beith Juniors F.C. players
Scottish Junior Football Association players
Scotland junior international footballers